The 1945–46 AHL season was the tenth season of the American Hockey League. Eight teams played 62 games each in the schedule. The Indianapolis Capitals won their third F. G. "Teddy" Oke Trophy as West Division champions. The Buffalo Bisons won their third Calder Cup in a four-year span.

Team changes
 The New Haven Eagles resume operations.

Final standings
Note: GP = Games played; W = Wins; L = Losses; T = Ties; GF = Goals for; GA = Goals against; Pts = Points;

Scoring leaders

Note: GP = Games played; G = Goals; A = Assists; Pts = Points; PIM = Penalty minutes

 complete list

Calder Cup playoffs

See also
List of AHL seasons

References
AHL official site
AHL Hall of Fame
HockeyDB

American Hockey League seasons
2